William Reid  (21 December 1921 – 28 November 2001) was a Scottish recipient of the Victoria Cross, the highest and most prestigious award for gallantry in the face of the enemy that can be awarded to British and Commonwealth forces. He earned his Victoria Cross as a pilot in the Royal Air Force Bomber Command during the Second World War.

Born in Baillieston, Lanarkshire, he applied to join the RAF on the outbreak of war.  After initial training, he was selected as a bomber pilot, and soon became a flying instructor himself.  He was eventually given an operational posting, flying several raids before that on Düsseldorf which led to the award of the VC.  On a later raid he was shot down and became a prisoner of war in Germany.  He left the RAF after the war, and worked in the agricultural industry.

On 19 November 2009 his VC was sold at auction for £384,000, a record for a VC awarded to a recipient from the United Kingdom.

Early life
William Reid was born in Baillieston, near Glasgow, on 21 December 1921 the son of a blacksmith. He was educated at Swinton Primary School and Coatbridge Higher Grade School and studied metallurgy for a time, but then applied to join the RAF. After training in Canada, he received his wings and was a sergeant when he was commissioned as a pilot officer on probation in the Royal Air Force Volunteer Reserve on 19 June 1942. He then trained on twin-engined Airspeed Oxfords at Little Rissington before moving to the Operational Training Unit at RAF North Luffenham. There, his skill as a pilot led to his being selected as an instructor, flying the Vickers Wellington, albeit with the promise of a posting to an Avro Lancaster heavy bomber unit.  He was promoted to flying officer on 19 December 1942.

The posting did not materialise until July 1943, when he was sent to 1654 Conversion Unit, RAF Wigsley, near Newark-on-Trent, where he flew his first operational mission as second pilot, in a Lancaster of 9 Squadron, in a raid on Mönchengladbach. In September he was posted to 61 Squadron at RAF Syerston, Newark, to commence Lancaster bombing operations, and flew seven sorties to various German cities before the raid on Düsseldorf.

Düsseldorf
Reid was a 21-year-old acting flight lieutenant, serving in 61 Squadron when he took part in the raid on Düsseldorf, Germany, for which he was awarded his VC.

On the night of 3 November 1943, while still underway to the target area in Düsseldorf, the windscreen of Reid's Lancaster (serial LM360) was shattered by rounds from an attacking Messerschmitt Bf 110 night fighter, badly damaging the cockpit and rear gun turret. In spite of multiple injuries Reid continued on his mission, though was again attacked shortly afterwards by a Focke-Wulf Fw 190, killing his navigator and fatally wounding the wireless operator. Reid himself was further wounded, as was the flight engineer. A section of the Lancaster's starboard tailplane had also been shot away. Reid again decided to carry on, saying later in an interview that his main reason for pressing on was that turning back would have involved flying through or across the following bomber stream, with the danger of mid-air collision.

Reaching the target, Reid released his bomb load and set course for home. Plotting a course back to Syerston, without a navigator, Reid gratefully noticed the searchlights of RAF Shipdham, a USAAF-operated base in Norfolk.

Despite his wounds and loss of blood, Reid successfully landed his plane, though its damaged undercarriage collapsed and the aircraft slid along the runway. The wireless operator died in Shipdham's medical centre but five of the crew survived.

Reid was awarded the VC on 14 December 1943, with the citation reading:

617 Squadron
After a period in hospital, Reid went to C Flight, 617 (Dambuster) Squadron at RAF Woodhall Spa in January 1944 and flew sorties to various targets in France.  He was promoted to substantive flight lieutenant on 14 June 1944.

On 31 July 1944, 617 Squadron was linked with 9 Squadron for a "Tallboy" deep penetration bomb attack on a V-weapon storage dump at Rilly-la-Montagne, near Rheims. As Reid, flying in Lancaster Mk.I ME557 KC-S, released his bomb over the target at 12,000 ft, he felt his aircraft shudder under the impact of a bomb dropped by another Lancaster 6,000 ft above. The bomb ploughed through his aeroplane's fuselage, severing all control cables and fatally weakening its structure, and Reid gave the order to bail out.

As members of his crew scrambled out, the plane went into a dive, pinning Reid to his seat. Reaching overhead, he managed to release the escape hatch panel and struggled out just as the Lancaster broke in two. He landed heavily by parachute, breaking his arm in the fall. Within an hour he was captured by a German patrol and taken prisoner. After various transfers, he ended the war in Stalag III-A prisoner of war camp at Luckenwalde, west of Berlin.

Post war
Reid was demobilised in 1946 and resumed his studies, first at the University of Glasgow and later at the West of Scotland Agricultural College. After graduating from the University of Glasgow in 1949, he went on a travelling scholarship for six months, studying agriculture in India, Australia, New Zealand, America and Canada.  He retained a reserve commission until 15 January 1949.

Later years
In 1950, he became an agricultural adviser to the MacRobert Trust, Douneside. From 1959 to his retirement in 1981, he was an adviser to a firm of animal feed manufacturers.

Reid is interviewed and provides a vivid description of the mission for which he was awarded the Victoria Cross in episode 12, "Whirlwind – Bombing Germany (September 1939 – April 1944)", of the acclaimed British documentary television series, The World at War.

Family
Reid married Violet Campbell Gallagher, a daughter of William Gallagher, sports editor of the Glasgow Daily Record in 1952. She was reportedly unaware that he was a VC holder until they were married.

Death
William Reid died at the age of 79 on 28 November 2001, survived by his wife and their two children.  On 19 November 2009, his VC was sold at an auction by medal specialists Spink.  It went to an anonymous bidder for £384,000, a record for a VC awarded to someone from the United Kingdom. The bidder was later revealed to be Melissa John, in memory of her late brother, and that she had outbid the buyers acting for Michael Ashcroft in the auction.

References

Sources
British VCs of World War 2 (John Laffin, 1997)
Monuments to Courage (David Harvey, 1999)
The Register of the Victoria Cross (This England, 1997)
Scotland's Forgotten Valour (Graham Ross, 1995)

External links

 
 Imperial War Museum Interview

1921 births
2001 deaths
People from Baillieston
Alumni of the University of Glasgow
British World War II bomber pilots
Military personnel from Glasgow
Royal Air Force officers
Royal Air Force pilots of World War II
Scottish airmen
Royal Air Force recipients of the Victoria Cross
Shot-down aviators
World War II prisoners of war held by Germany
British World War II recipients of the Victoria Cross
Royal Air Force Volunteer Reserve personnel of World War II
Alumni of Scotland's Rural College